The Mississippi National Guard (MSNG), commonly known as the Mississippi Guard, is both a Mississippi state and a federal government organization, part of the United States National Guard. It is part of the Mississippi Military Department, a state agency of the government of Mississippi. The Adjutant General of Mississippi (TAG), Major General Janson Durr Boyles, serves as the executive director and is subordinate to the Commander-in-Chief, the Governor of Mississippi, in matters relating to the department and the state militia forces.

The Mississippi Code of 1972, Title 33, Chapter 3, titled "Military Affairs", details the duties and responsibilities of the Adjutant General of Mississippi. The Adjutant General of Mississippi, via the Mississippi Military Department, is expressly authorized to "issue such orders, rules and regulations as may be necessary in order that the organization, training and discipline of the components of the militia of this state will at all times conform to the applicable requirements of the United States government relating thereto. Orders, rules and regulations issued hereunder shall have full force and effect as part of the military code of this state".

The state militia forces formally break down into three broad classes: The Mississippi National Guard (MSNG), the Mississippi State Guard (MSSG), and the unorganized militia.

Mission
The Constitution of the United States specifically charges the National Guard with dual federal and state missions. In fact, the National Guard is the only United States military force empowered to function in a state status. Those functions range from limited actions during non-emergency situations to full-scale law enforcement of martial law when local law enforcement officials can no longer maintain civil control. 
The National Guard may be called into federal service in response to a call by the President or Congress.

When National Guard troops are called to federal service, the President serves as Commander-in-Chief. The federal mission assigned to the National Guard is: "To provide properly trained and equipped units for prompt mobilization for war, National emergency or as otherwise needed." The Governor may call individuals or units of the Mississippi National Guard into state service during emergencies or to assist in special situations which lend themselves to the use of the National Guard. The state mission assigned to the National Guard is: "To provide trained and disciplined forces for domestic emergencies or as otherwise provided by state law."

National Guard units can be mobilized at any time by presidential order to supplement regular armed forces, and upon declaration of a state of emergency by the governor of the state in which they serve. Unlike Army Reserve members, National Guard members cannot be mobilized individually (except through voluntary transfers and Temporary Duty Assignments TDY), but only as part of their respective units. However, there has been a significant number of individual activations to support military operations (2001-?); the legality of this policy is a major issue within the National Guard.

History
During the Vietnam War, service in the National Guard was highly sought after. An enlistment in the Guard prevented a person from being sent to combat. In 1968, the Mississippi National Guard had 10,365 soldiers. At the time only 1% of them were black. At that time, the population of the state was more than forty percent black.

Command structure
The Mississippi National Guard consists of the:

Mississippi Army National Guard
Mississippi Air National Guard
 172nd Airlift Wing
 186th Air Refueling Wing
 Combat Readiness Training Center
 209th Civil Engineering Squadron
 238th Air Support Operations Squadron
 248th Air Traffic Control Squadron
 255th Air Control Squadron

Mississippi State Guard
Mississippi's state defense force, the Mississippi State Guard, is a military entity authorized by both the State Code of Mississippi and executive order. The State Guard is the state's authorized militia and assumes the state mission of the Mississippi National Guard in the event the MS National Guard is mobilized. This force is federally recognized, but are separate from the National Guard and are not meant to be federalized. The SDF comprises retired active and reserve military personnel and selected professional persons who volunteer their time and talents in further service to their state.

References

External links

Mississippi Armed Forces Museum
National Guard Association of Mississippi

 
1798 establishments in the United States
National Guard
Military units and formations established in 1798
National Guard (United States)
Organizations based in Jackson, Mississippi
National Guard